Thomas Ruffin (1787–1870) was an American jurist and justice of the North Carolina Supreme Court from 1829 to 1852 and again from 1858 to 1859.  He was chief justice of that Court from 1833 to 1852.

Biography
Thomas Ruffin was born on November 17, 1787, at the residence of his maternal grandfather Thomas Roane at Newington in King and Queen County, Virginia. Ruffin graduated from the College of New Jersey and studied law in North Carolina under Archibald Murphey.  He began the practice of law in Hillsborough, North Carolina, where he also farmed.  He was elected to several terms in the North Carolina House of Commons and served as a Superior Court judge from 1816 to 1818 and from 1825 to 1828.  In 1828, the state called upon Ruffin to bring the State Bank of North Carolina out of debt as its new President, which he did in one year.  The legislature then named him to the state Supreme Court.

Supreme Court service
"The election of former Superior Court Judge and State Bank President Ruffin to the bench in 1829 effectively ensured the North Carolina Supreme Court's survival," according to Martin Brinkley. Ranked by Harvard Law School Dean Roscoe Pound as one of the ten greatest jurists in American history, Ruffin singlehandedly transformed the common law of North Carolina into an instrument of economic change. His writings on the subject of eminent domain—the right of the state to seize private property for the public good—paved the way for the expansion of railroads into North Carolina, enabling the "Rip Van Winkle State" to embrace the industrial revolution. Ruffin's opinions were cited as persuasive authority by appellate tribunals throughout the United States. The influence his decisions exercised upon the nascent jurisprudence of the states then known as the Southwest (Alabama, Louisiana, Tennessee, Arkansas, and Mississippi), which were settled by emigrating North Carolinians in large numbers, made Ruffin a celebrated figure at home. Public veneration of the "stern prophet," as Ruffin was called, preserved his Court from destruction by populist politicians.

Together, Justice William Gaston and Ruffin, whom his colleagues elected Chief Justice in 1833 (by a coin toss, according to a popular but probably apocryphal account), dominated their less-talented brother judges, rendering treatise-like opinions that inspired one contemporary to exclaim: "No State of the Union . . . not even the United States, ever had a superior Bench; few ever had its equal."

Ruffin was involved, sometimes secretly and illegally, in the slave industry as a slave owner and a slave trader which led directly to one of his most heinous rulings protecting the institution.

Ruffin delivered the decision in the case of North Carolina v. Mann (1830), which sanctioned the "absolute" power of a master over a slave.

Ruffin also authored the Dougherty v. Stepp (1835), a staple of first-year Torts classes in American law schools used to teach students about the tort of trespass upon real property.

Ruffin retired in 1852 to his plantation in Alamance County, but the legislature called him back to the Court in 1858.  He retired again after about one year, at the age of 78.

Later life and legacy

His home after the end of the American Civil War until his death in 1870, the Ruffin-Roulhac House at Hillsborough, was listed on the National Register of Historic Places in 1971.

In addition to his legal and political career, Ruffin was an innovative farmer, and was president of the state's Agricultural Society from 1854 to 1860. In that capacity, he oversaw the operation of the North Carolina State Fair. He maintained close contact with his cousin Edmund Ruffin, a noted antebellum agricultural reformer.

Ruffin was also a trustee of the University of North Carolina at Chapel Hill for some 24 years. A building at the university, Ruffin Hall, was originally named in his honor but in 2020, the university board of trustees decided it would tentatively be named only in honor of his son, Thomas Ruffin Jr.

The unincorporated community of Ruffin, in Rockingham County, is named for Thomas Ruffin.

A statue of Ruffin once stood at the North Carolina Court of Appeals building in Raleigh, but was removed in 2020. Later that same year, the North Carolina Supreme Court removed a portrait of Ruffin from its courtroom.

References

Further reading

External links

Supreme Court Official History by Martin H. Brinkley
NC Business Leader magazine
Thomas Ruffin Papers - University of North Carolina
The Perils of Public Homage: Thomas Ruffin and State v. Mann in History and Memory
The Perils of Public Homage: State v. Mann and Thomas Ruffin in History and Memory (details)
Picture of Thomas Ruffin from UNC

People of North Carolina in the American Civil War
Chief Justices of the North Carolina Supreme Court
Princeton University alumni
1870 deaths
1787 births
People from King and Queen County, Virginia
People from Hillsborough, North Carolina
American slave owners
American planters
People from Alamance County, North Carolina
Members of the North Carolina House of Representatives
American slave traders
19th-century American politicians
19th-century American judges
Ruffin family